Koloyad  is a village in Kannur district in the Indian state of Kerala.

Demographics
As of 2011 Census, Koloyad had a population of 12,616, with 5,977 (47.4%) males and 6,639 (52.6%) females. Average male female sex ratio was 1111 higher than the state average of 1084. In Koloyad, 9.77% of the population was under 6 years of age. Koloyad had an average literacy of 90.6% lower than the state average of 94%; male literacy was 94% and female literacy was 87.7%.

Transportation
The national highway passes through Kannur town.  Mangalore and Mumbai can be accessed on the northern side and Cochin and Thiruvananthapuram can be accessed on the southern side.  The road to the east of Iritty connects to Mysore and Bangalore.   The nearest railway station is Kannur on Mangalore-Palakkad line. There are airports at Mangalore and Calicut.

References

Villages near Kuthuparamba